Paul Harold Todd Jr. (September 22, 1921November 18, 2008) was an American politician, soldier, and business executive from the U.S. state of Michigan. He served one term in the U.S. House of Representatives from 1965 to 1967.

Early life and education 
Todd was born in Kalamazoo, Michigan, the son of Paul H. Todd, mayor of Kalamazoo in 1937, and the grandson of Albert M. Todd, former U.S. representative and the "Peppermint King" founder of the A.M. Todd Company. Todd graduated from Beverly Hills High School in 1937. He received a B.S. from Cornell University in 1943.

Career

Military career 
Todd served in the United States Army Signal Corps and the Office of Strategic Services from 1942 to 1945. He received a bronze star for his service during World War II. He was founder of Kalamazoo Spice Extraction Co. (now known as Kalsec) in 1958.

Congress 
In 1962, he unsuccessfully challenged incumbent Republican U.S. Representative August E. Johansen in Michigan's 3rd congressional district. In 1964, Todd defeated Johansen to be elected as a Democrat to the 89th Congress, serving from January 3, 1965, to January 3, 1967. He was known as one of the Michigan Five Fluke Freshmen and in 1966, lost in the general election to Republican Garry E. Brown.

Later career 
Todd later served as chief executive officer of Planned Parenthood from 1967 to 1970. He was appointed to the Governor's Commission on Ethics and served from 1972 to 1976. He was an unsuccessful candidate for election to the 94th Congress in 1974. He is a former chair of the Board of Directors of Pathfinder International.

Personal life 
Before his death on November 18, 2008, Todd resided in Kalamazoo, Michigan. Todd was married to Terry for 51 years and together they had four children. Terry preceded him in death in 1997. Todd married Caroline Ham, a former Kalamazoo mayor, in 2004.

References

1921 births
2008 deaths
Cornell University alumni
United States Army soldiers
United States Army personnel of World War II
Politicians from Kalamazoo, Michigan
People from Beverly Hills, California
Democratic Party members of the United States House of Representatives from Michigan
20th-century American politicians
People associated with Planned Parenthood